Zastań  (German Zünz) is a village in the administrative district of Gmina Wolin, within Kamień County, West Pomeranian Voivodeship, in north-western Poland.

The village has a population of 120.

References

Villages in Kamień County